Iberochondrostoma lemmingii is a species of ray-finned fish in the family Cyprinidae. It is found in Portugal and Spain. It lives in the middle and lower reaches of rivers with slow current.

Until recently, I. lemmingii was placed in the genus Chondrostoma. Fish that now are recognized as Achondrostoma salmantinum were earlier included in I. lemmingii.

The maximum length of I. lemmingii  TL.

References

Iberochondrostoma
Endemic fish of the Iberian Peninsula
Fish described in 1866
Taxonomy articles created by Polbot